Tešova is a settlement in the hills north of Vransko in central Slovenia. The area is part of the traditional region of Styria. The Municipality of Vransko is now included in the Savinja Statistical Region.

A small chapel-shrine in the settlement dates to the late 19th century.

References

External links
Tešova at Geopedia

Populated places in the Municipality of Vransko